Qarabag Khankendi is an Azerbaijani football club based in Baku. Football club that for the 2007/08 season plays in the AFFA Amateur League (a minor league in the Azerbaijani football league system). Nadir Gasimov is the coach for the 2007/08 season.

History
The club was founded in 1927. In 1977 they also won Azerbaijan USSR League.

Achievements
Azerbaijan USSR League Champions (1): 1977

Current squad

References

Football clubs in Azerbaijan
1927 establishments in Azerbaijan
Association football clubs established in 1927